Cross Lanes or Cross Lane may refer to one of these places:

 Cross Lanes, Cornwall, hamlet in England
 Cross Lane, settlement on the Isle of Wight, England
 Cross Lanes, Wrexham, hamlet in Wales
 Cross Lanes, West Virginia, settlement in United States
 Cross Lanes Christian School, school in West Virginia, United States
 Keslers Cross Lanes, West Virginia, unincorporated community in the United States

See also 
 Battle of Cross Lanes, battle of the American Civil War